Cape Brett Peninsula is a  long peninsula in the Bay of Islands, in the Northland Region of New Zealand.

The head of the peninsula is Cape Brett itself (also known by the Māori), a promontory which extends north into the Pacific Ocean at the eastern end of the Bay of Islands. The Rakaumangamanga/Cape Brett Track begins in Rawhiti, at the Opourua Bay (Oke Bay) Scenic Reserve Entrance. Sea Shuttle Bay of Islands provides a water taxi service from Opourua/Oke Bay to Maunganui Bay (Deep Water Cove) for hikers to do the track one way.

Cape Brett Lighthouse stands at the end of the peninsula, which rises to 360 metres at its northern end. A noted landmark, the natural arch "Hole in the Rock" of Piercy Island lies about 500 metres off the cape.

A predator proof fence across the peninsula excludes the brushtail possum, an introduced animal pest, which feeds on the pohutukawa tree to such an extent that the tree can eventually die.

The peninsula includes Opourua/Oke Bay, off Rawhiti Road, about 29 km from Russell.

References

Far North District
Bay of Islands
Peninsulas of the Northland Region